Glen Elder Township is a township in Mitchell County, Kansas, USA.

Adjacent townships
 Walnut Township (south)
 Turkey Creek Township (southeast)
 Solomon Rapids Township (east)
 Browns Creek Township (northeast)
 Athens Township (north)
 Walnut Township (south)
 Cawker Township (west)
 Carr Creek Township (southwest)

Major highways
 US-24
 K-9
 K-128

References

Townships in Mitchell County, Kansas
Townships in Kansas